The 1925 college football season ended with no clear national champion. At the close of the season, noted sports writer Billy Evans described the championship contest as "a dead heat" among Dartmouth, Tulane, Michigan, Washington, and Alabama.

Dartmouth, led by halfback Andy Oberlander, compiled an 8–0 record and outscored its opponents by a total of 340 to 29. Having defeated Harvard, Cornell, and Chicago, Dartmouth was retroactively declared the national champion by the Dickinson System and Parke H. Davis.

Alabama compiled a 10–0 record and has been recognized as national champion by the Billingsley Report, Boand System, College Football Researchers Association, Helms Athletic Foundation, and others. In an intersectional game between undefeated teams, Alabama defeated Pacific Coast Conference champion Washington by a 20–19 score in the 1926 Rose Bowl; that game has been called "the game that changed the South."

Michigan shut out seven of eight opponents, outscored all opponents by a total of 227 to 3, and was retroactively named a co-national champion by Jeff Sagarin. The team featured two consensus All-Americans in quarterback Benny Friedman and end Bennie Oosterbaan, a passing combination that became known as the "Benny to Bennie Show".  Michigan coach Fielding H. Yost called his 1925 squad "the greatest football team I ever saw in action."

Tulane also went undefeated at 9–0–1. Tulane halfback Peggy Flournoy led the nation in scoring with 128 points.

Colgate, Louisville, Michigan State Normal, Hawaii, Nebraska Wesleyan, and Oberlin also had undefeated teams in 1925.

Conference and program changes

Conference changes
Two conferences began play in 1925:
Far Western Conference – active through the 1998 season; later known as the Northern California Athletic Conference
New York State Conference – active through the 1934 season
One conference played its final season in 1925:
Louisiana Intercollegiate Athletic Association – active since the 1912 season
One conference changed its name in 1925:
The Southwest Intercollegiate Athletic Conference shortened its official name to just the Southwest Conference, the name it would retain until its dissolution in 1996.

Membership changes

September

October
 On October 3, Washington played a double-header and defeated both teams by scores of 59–0 and 56–0. Southern Conference co-champion Tulane and Missouri Valley champion Missouri played to a 3–3 tie in New Orleans. Michigan beat its rivel Michigan State, 39–0.  Alabama defeated Birmingham–Southern, 50–7 in a Friday game. Dartmouth beat , 34–0.
 On October 10, Michigan beat Indiana 63–0, Alabama won at LSU, 42–0, and Tulane beat Ole Miss, 26–7. Missouri beat Nebraska, 9–6. Washington defeated visiting Montana 30–10. Dartmouth defeated Vermont, 50–0.
 On October 17 at Yankee Stadium, Army beat Notre Dame, 27–0.  Washington and Nebraska played to a 6–6 tie at Lincoln.  In Birmingham, Alabama beat Sewanee 42–0, while in New Orleans, Tulane beat Mississippi State, 25–3.  Michigan won at Wisconsin 21–0. Colgate met Lafayette at Philadelphia, and the two played to a 7–7 tie.  Dartmouth beat Maine 56–0.
On October 24, Michigan narrowly won at Illinois, but recorded another shutout, 3–0.  In Chicago, Tulane beat Northwestern, 18–7.  In Atlanta, Alabama beat Georgia Tech, 7–0. Missouri beat Kansas State, 3–0.  Washington beat Whitman College, 64–2, while Stanford beat Oregon State 26–10.  Notre Dame won at Minnesota. 19–7.  Colgate beat Princeton, 9–0, and Dartmouth won at Harvard, 32–9, its best victory to date over the Crimson.  Penn beat visiting Chicago, 7–0. 
 On October 31, Michigan stayed unbeaten, untied, and unscored upon, defeating visiting Navy, 54–0.  In its first five games, Michigan had outscored the opposition 180–0.  Syracuse also remained unscored upon with a 7–0 win over Penn State, having outscored its foes 160–0 in six games.  Dartmouth stayed unbeaten with a 14–0 win at Brown.  Penn dropped from the unbeaten ranks with a 24–2 loss to Illinois.   Yale handed visiting Army its first loss, 28–7. Texas A&M won at Baylor, 13–0.  Missouri beat Iowa State, 23–8.  Washington won at Washington State, 23–0. Stanford beat Oregon 35–13 and Colgate won at Michigan State 14–0. In Atlanta, Notre Dame beat Georgia Tech, 13–0, while in Montgomery, Tulane beat Auburn by the same score.  Alabama beat Mississippi State, 6–0.

November
On November 7,  Michigan (5–0–0) was upset by Northwestern, which won 3–2.  The field goal represented the only score against Michigan in an otherwise perfect season. A steady downpour with 40–mile-per-hour winds and five inches of mud hindered Michigan's passing game.  Dartmouth (6–0–0) hosted Cornell (5–0–0) in a meeting of unbeatens, winning 62–13. Andy Oberlander had 477 yards in total offense, including six touchdown passes, a Dartmouth record which still stands. Cornell coach Gil Dobie responded, "We won the game 13–0, passing is not football." Syracuse, which had not been scored upon in six games, was tied 3–3 by Ohio Wesleyan College.  At Penn State, Notre Dame and the Nittany Lions played to a 0–0 tie.  At St. Louis, Missouri beat Washington 14–0.  Colgate beat Providence 19–7, Penn beat Haverford 66–0, and Army beat Davis & Elkins, 14–6. Texas A & M (5–0–1) and Texas Christian (4–1–1) met, with TCU handing the Aggies their first defeat, 3–0.   Washington (6–0–1) hosted Stanford (5–1–0) and won 13–0.  In Birmingham, Alabama beat Kentucky 31–0 and in New Orleans, Tulane beat Louisiana Tech 37–9.  Georgia Tech beat Vanderbilt 7–0. Star back Doug Wycoff was hurt, such that he had to use his substitute Dick Wright. On a muddy field, Wright ran off tackle and dodged Vanderbilt's safety Gil Reese, "usually a sure tackler," to get the touchdown to give Georgia Tech a 7–0 victory. Coach William Alexander called it the most spectacular play he ever saw.
On November 14,  Syracuse hosted Colgate in a matchup of unbeatens (both 6–0–1); Colgate won 19–6. In New York, Columbia handed Army its first defeat, 21–7.  Dartmouth won at Chicago, 33–7, to close with a perfect 8–0–0 record. Oberlander threw three touchdowns.  At Montgomery, Alabama (8–0–0) met Florida (6–1–0) and won 34–0.  Tulane shut out Sewanee, 14–0.  In Houston, Texas A & M beat Rice 17–0, while TCU beat visiting Arkansas, 3–0.  Missouri stayed unbeaten with a 16–14 win over Oklahoma, and Washington stayed unbeaten with a 7–0 win at California.  Stanford beat visiting UCLA, 82–0.  Michigan beat Ohio State 10–0.  Cornell beat Canisius 33–0, Pittsburgh defeated Penn 14–0, and Notre Dame beat visiting Carnegie Tech 26–0. In the Georgia-Georgia Tech game, Tech quarterback Ike Williams thought the game clock read five seconds remaining in the game, when in actuality it was five minutes.  Williams set up his offense for a field goal and kicked it to put Tech up 3–0 on first down. Luckily for Williams, Tech won 3–0.

On November 21, previously unbeaten Missouri lost at Kansas, 10–7,  Michigan beat Minnesota 35–0,  Tulane won at LSU, 16–0,  TCU defeated Austin College, 21–0,  Washington beat Puget Sound 80–7, and  Stanford closed its season with a 27–14 win over California.   Syracuse beat Niagara 17–0, Notre Dame defeated Northwestern, 13–10, and Army beat Ursinus 44–0.
On Thanksgiving Day, November 26, Syracuse and Columbia met at the Polo Grounds in New York, with Syracuse winning 16–5.  Penn handed Cornell its second loss, 7–0.  Notre Dame lost at Nebraska, 17–0, in the Four Horsemen's first collegiate loss.  Texas A&M and Texas, both 6–1–1, met, with A&M winning 28–0.  Alabama beat Georgia 27–0 in Birmingham to close the regular season with nine wins, and no losses or ties.  In those nine games, the Crimson Tide had outscored its opponents 277–7.  Tulane closed its season with a 14–0 at Centenary College and finished unbeaten, with one tie (9–0–1).
On November 28, Washington closed its season unbeaten with a 15–14 win over Oregon, and elected to meet Alabama in the Rose Bowl.  At Providence, Colgate and Brown played to a 14–14 tie.  In the Army–Navy Game, Army closed its season with a 10–3 win.

Rose Bowl

The 1926 Rose Bowl pairing  of Alabama and Washington later became the subject of a television documentary, Roses of Crimson, and hailed as "the football game that changed the South". Alabama was the first Southern football team to be invited to play in the Rose Bowl, and proved that the Southern teams could compete with those from the East, the Midwest, and the West Coast.  George Wilson helped the Huskies take a 12–0 lead at halftime, but both extra point attempts failed, and Wilson was injured.  In the third quarter, Alabama exploded for three touchdowns, starting with quarterback Pooley Hubert's run to make the score 12–7.  Washington lost the ball on its 35-yard line, and Johnny Mack Brown carried the ball over to make the score 14–12 in favor of Alabama.  A 61-yard pass from Hubert to Brown set up Alabama's third score for a 20–12 lead.  George Wilson returned in the fourth quarter, and the Huskies scored a touchdown and the point after to close the score to 20–19, but the missed conversion attempts from the first half cost them the game.  The victory for Coach Wallace Wade established Alabama as a football powerhouse.

Conference standings

Major conference standings

Independents

Minor conferences

Minor conference standings

Awards and honors

All-Americans

The consensus All-America team included:

Statistical leaders
Player scoring most points: Peggy Flournoy, Tulane, 128
Player scoring most touchdowns: Peggy Flournoy, Tulane and Mort Kaer, USC, 19
Total offense leader: Andy Oberlander, Dartmouth, 1147+
Passing yards leader: Benny Friedman, Michigan, 760
Passing touchdowns leader: Andy Oberlander, Dartmouth, 14
Receiving touchdowns leader: Myles Lane, Dartmouth, 7

References